Herstory is a term for history written from a feminist perspective and emphasizing the role of women, or told from a woman's point of view. It originated as an alteration of the word "history", as part of a feminist critique of conventional historiography, which in their opinion is traditionally written as "his story", i.e., from the male point of view. The term is a neologism since the word "history"—from the Ancient Greek word  ἱστορία, or more directly from its Latin derivate historia, meaning "knowledge obtained by inquiry"— is etymologically unrelated to the possessive pronoun his. In fact, Roman languages originally attribute the word to the female grammatical form, for instance la storia in Italian - a Mediterranean language historically linked closest to Latin.

Usage
The Oxford English Dictionary credits Robin Morgan with first using the term "herstory" in print in her 1970 anthology Sisterhood is Powerful. Concerning the feminist organization W.I.T.C.H., Morgan wrote:

The fluidity and wit of the witches is evident in the ever-changing acronym: the basic, original title was Women's International Terrorist Conspiracy from Hell [...] and the latest heard at this writing is Women Inspired to Commit Herstory.

During the 1970s and 1980s, second-wave feminists saw the study of history as a male-dominated intellectual enterprise and presented "herstory" as a means of compensation.  The term, intended to be both serious and comic, became a rallying cry used on T-shirts and buttons as well as in academia.

In 2017, Hridith Sudev, an inventor, environmentalist and social activist associated with various youth movements, launched 'The Herstory Movement,' an online platform to "celebrate lesser known great persons; female, queer or otherwise marginalized, who helped shape the modern World History." It is intended as an academic platform to feature stories of female historic persons and thus help facilitate more widespread knowledge about 'Great Women' History.

Non-profit organizations Global G.L.O.W and LitWorld created a joint initiative called the "HerStory Campaign". This campaign works with 25 other countries to share girl's lives and stories. They encourage others to join the campaign and to "raise our voices on behalf of all world's girls".

The herstory movement has spawned women-centered presses, such as Virago Press in 1973, which publishes fiction and non-fiction by noted women authors like Janet Frame and Sarah Dunant.

This movement has led to an increase in activity in other female-centric disciplines such as femistry and galgebra.

Criticism
Christina Hoff Sommers has been a vocal critic of the concept of herstory, and presented her argument against the movement in her 1994 book Who Stole Feminism? Sommers defined herstory as an attempt to infuse education with ideology at the expense of knowledge. The "gender feminists", as she called them, were the group of feminists responsible for the movement, which she felt amounted to negationism. She regarded most attempts to make historical studies more female-inclusive as being artificial in nature and an impediment to progress.

Professor and author Devoney Looser has criticized the concept of herstory for overlooking the contributions that some women made as historians before the twentieth century.

Author Richard Dawkins also described his criticism in The God Delusion,  arguing that "the word history has not been influenced by the male pronoun".

See also
Women's history
Feminist history
History of feminism
Radical feminism
Womyn
Gender-neutral language

References

Further reading
Herstory: Women Who Changed the World. .
Daughters of Eve: A Herstory Book. .
HerStory. .
Herstory: A Woman's View of American History. .

1970 neologisms
Historiography
Feminism and history
Lesbian history
Nonstandard spelling